The Junction Boulevard station (originally Junction Avenue station) is an express station on the IRT Flushing Line of the New York City Subway, located at the intersection of Junction Boulevard and Roosevelt Avenue in Corona, Queens. It is served by the 7 train at all times and by rush hour peak-direction <7> express service.

History

Early history 
The 1913 Dual Contracts called for the Interborough Rapid Transit Company (IRT) and Brooklyn Rapid Transit Company (BRT; later Brooklyn–Manhattan Transit Corporation, or BMT) to build new lines in Brooklyn, Queens, and the Bronx. Queens did not receive many new IRT and BRT lines compared to Brooklyn and the Bronx, since the city's Public Service Commission (PSC) wanted to alleviate subway crowding in the other two boroughs first before building in Queens, which was relatively undeveloped. The IRT Flushing Line was to be one of two Dual Contracts lines in the borough, along with the Astoria Line; it would connect Flushing and Long Island City, two of Queens' oldest settlements, to Manhattan via the Steinway Tunnel. When the majority of the line was built in the early 1910s, most of the route went through undeveloped land, and Roosevelt Avenue had not been constructed. Community leaders advocated for more Dual Contracts lines to be built in Queens to allow development there.

This elevated station opened on April 21, 1917, as Junction Avenue, as part of a large extension of the Flushing Line from its previous eastern terminus at Queensboro Plaza to Alburtis Avenue (now 103rd Street–Corona Plaza). It was part of the Brooklyn–Manhattan Transit Corporation, albeit served by shuttles of IRT dimensions, and the two companies jointly operated the Flushing and Astoria Lines due to the provisions of the Dual Contracts. The station was renamed Junction Boulevard in 1940.

Later years 
The city government took over the IRT's operations on June 12, 1940. The IRT routes were given numbered designations in 1948 with the introduction of "R-type" rolling stock, which contained rollsigns with numbered designations for each service. The route from Times Square to Flushing became known as the 7. On October 17, 1949, the joint BMT/IRT operation of the Flushing Line ended, and the line became the responsibility of the IRT. After the end of BMT/IRT dual service, the New York City Board of Transportation announced that the Flushing Line platforms would be lengthened to 11 IRT car lengths; the platforms were only able to fit nine 51-foot-long IRT cars beforehand. The platforms at the station were extended in 1955–1956 to accommodate 11-car trains. However, nine-car trains continued to run on the 7 route until 1962, when they were extended to ten cars. With the opening of the 1964 New York World's Fair, trains were lengthened to eleven cars. 

In 1981, the Metropolitan Transportation Authority listed the station among the 69 most deteriorated stations in the subway system.

Station layout

This station has two island platforms and three tracks. The two outer local tracks are used by the full-time 7 local service while the middle express track is used by the rush-hour peak direction <7> express service. Both platforms have red canopies with green frames and support columns in the center and are narrower at either ends.

Exits
This station has one elevated station house beneath the platforms tracks. Four staircases from each corner of Junction Boulevard and Roosevelt Avenue go up to a mezzanine that has a token booth in the center and a turnstile bank on the east and west sides. These turnstile banks lead to a crossunder and has a single staircase going up to each platform towards the west (railroad south) end.

This station was made ADA accessible in 2007, at the cost of $6 million. From the northeast corner of the intersection this station is located at, a single elevator goes up to an enclosed overpass above the platforms with an intermediate stop at the mezzanine. The overpass has two HEET turnstiles and a gate that is automatically opened when a MetroCard is swiped at either turnstile. Inside, two elevators go down to the platforms, one for each. Previously, an "AutoGate" Reduced-fare MetroCard was required to open the gate. An emergency staircase goes down to the Manhattan-bound platform and an employee-facility is on the Flushing-bound end of the overpass.

References

External links 

 
 Station Reporter — 7 Train
 The Subway Nut — Junction Boulevard Pictures
 Junction Boulevard entrance from Google Maps Street View
 Platforms from Google Maps Street View

IRT Flushing Line stations
New York City Subway stations in Queens, New York
Railway stations in the United States opened in 1917
1917 establishments in New York City
Corona, Queens